Everett Carll Ladd Jr. (September 24, 1937 December 8, 1999) was an American political scientist based at the University of Connecticut.  He was best known for his analysis and collection of public opinion polls. He directed the Roper Center for Public Opinion Research at the University of Connecticut; the Center's mission is to collect and preserve the reports and the original raw computerized data (on IBM cards and tapes) of polls and surveys since the 1930s.  At his death, he had amassed 14,000 surveys from many countries.  He was also an expert on the opinions and careers of social scientists.

Biography 
Ladd was born on September 24, 1937, in Saco, Maine. He graduated from Bates College, and earned a PhD in political science from Cornell University. He was appointed professor of political science at the University Connecticut in 1964, and retired in 1999.

He wrote more than twenty books, including a widely used university textbook on American government (The American Polity: The People and Their Government). He taught at the American Enterprise Institute for Public Policy Research in Washington, D.C. He was awarded fellowships by the Ford, Guggenheim and Rockefeller Foundations; the Center for International Studies at Harvard University; and the Hoover Institution and the Center for Advanced Study in the Behavioral Sciences, both at Stanford University.  He has been called, "One of the leading realignment theorists."

Ladd was critical of grand models of realignment, and focused instead on highly specific details in major presidential elections. In his book Ideology in America he considered a spectrum from parochialism to cosmopolitanism in addition to the usual spectrum between liberalism and conservatism. In a review by L. A. Free it is asserted that cosmopolitanism may account for why "managers of big companies can realistically be described as liberals" and parochialism is why "many of the blue collar group [have] become conservative".

He reached out to the public through a column in The Christian Science Monitor (19871995) and op-ed essays in The Wall Street Journal, The New York Times and elsewhere. The media often interviewed him regarding new polling results. He was a senior editor of Public Opinion magazine and an editor at The American Enterprise magazine.

He died of heart failure on December 8, 1999 at Windham Memorial Community Hospital in Willimantic, Connecticut.

Selected publications 
 
  Reprinted with new introduction 1986 by University Press of America.
   Review in JSTOR.
 
 
  Review in JSTOR.
 
  Review in JSTOR.
  Review in JSTOR.
  Review in JSTOR.
  Textbook: 5th edition 1993.

References

External links 
 Roper Center for Public Opinion Research
 
 

1937 births
1999 deaths
American political scientists
Bates College alumni
Cornell University alumni
University of Connecticut faculty
Public opinion
People from Saco, Maine
American textbook writers
20th-century political scientists